Recode is a technology news website.

Recode or recoding may also refer to:

 Recode (database), a biological database
 Recode, an act or product of transcoding a digital bitstream
 Recoding (biology), the process of genetic translation
 Recode (non-profit organization)

See also
 Decoder (disambiguation)
 Code (disambiguation)
 Decoding (disambiguation)